On Children is a 2018 ten-part Mandarin-language TV series, directed by Chen Hui-ling and starring Tzu-Chuan Liu, Yu-Xuan Wang and Hsin-Yu Ling, based on the novel by Wu Xiaole. The plots are in anthology form with five different stories told in a world where individuals face the tragic consequences of social pressure, parental oppression and family dysfunction.

Cast
 Tzu-Chuan Liu as Chi Pei-Wei
 Yu-Xuan Wang as Liu Chiao-Yi
 Hsin-Yu Ling as Cheng Fang-Lan
 Emilia Chen as Emilia Chen
 Yu-Tung Lee as Shih Yu-Chieh
 Chiung-Hsuan Hsieh as Fang Mei-Chi
 Herbie Robert Baron as Chang Kai-Hsiang
 Chuan-Chen Yeh as Yang Chuan
 Hsiu-Fu Liu as Chung Kuo-Yen
 Gingle Wang as Molly Lin
 Frances Wu as Nova Yang
 Chen Yi-wen as Liu Ching-Hui
 Elten Ting as Ling-Na
 Yu-Ping Wang as Lo Chih-Wei
 Hsin Shao as Chung Chia-Hung
 Mohammad Umar Afzal as Chien Sheng-Yao
 Ting-Hsuan Lin as Liu Chiao-Hsin
 Yen Tsao as Lu Chih-Hsiung
 Kai-Ling Hsu as Le-Le
 Ivy Yin as Molly's mother

Episodes

Release
On Children was released on July 7, 2018 on Taiwanese Public Television Service.

Awards and nominations

References

External links
 
  
 

2018 Taiwanese television series debuts
2018 Taiwanese television series endings
2010s anthology television series
2010s horror television series
Domestic violence in television
Examinations and testing in fiction
Science fiction anthology television series
Public Television Service original programming
Taiwanese anthology television series
Television shows based on books